Phoenix Green is a village in the Hart District of Hampshire, England. It is nearby to Winchfield railway station.
It is home to the award winning hedgehog hospital, Hedgehog Cabin

External links
 Hampshire Treasures: Volume 3 (Hart and Rushmoor) pages 74, 75, 79, 84, 85, 86, and 87

Villages in Hampshire